Timkino is a rural locality (a selo) in Pokhodsky Rural Okrug of Nizhnekolymsky District in the Sakha Republic, Russia, located  from Chersky, the administrative center of the district and  from Pokhodsk. Its population as of the 2010 Census was 0, the same as recorded during the 2002 Census.

References

Notes

Sources
Official website of the Sakha Republic. Registry of the Administrative-Territorial Divisions of the Sakha Republic. Nizhnekolymsky District. 

Rural localities in Nizhnekolymsky District